Lyalya Chyornaya (1909–1982) was a Soviet actress of theater and cinema, Honored Artist of the RSFSR, actress of the Romen Theatre, dancer, singer of gypsy songs and romances.

She was born in 1909 in Nalchik, in the family of the Moscow nobleman Sergey Alekseevich Kiselyov and the gypsy Maria Georgievna Polyakova, the singer and dancer of the Strelna Gipsy Choir of Lebedev.

At the age of 13 she entered the professional stage for the first time as a dancer in Polyakova's choir, where she worked until the opening of the theater Romen. From the day of its foundation in 1931 until 1972, Lyalya Chyornaya worked at the theater Romen. She played more than 35 roles (including main roles) in theater productions, starred in the film The Last Campaign as Alta.

In many respects she influenced the formation of the variety manner of the dance.

References

External links

Цыганская музыка: Ляля Чёрная
 

1909 births
1982 deaths
Soviet women singers
Soviet film actresses
Soviet stage actresses
Honored Artists of the RSFSR
Soviet female dancers
Soviet Romani people
People from Nalchik
Burials at Novodevichy Cemetery
Russian Romani people